Timothy Wynter (born 16 January 1996) is a Jamaican swimmer. He competed in the men's 100 metre backstroke event at the 2016 Summer Olympics. He was on the USC swim team and majored in psychology. He also set the Jamaican national record for 50m and 100m backstroke in 2016.

References

External links
 

1996 births
Living people
Jamaican male swimmers
Olympic swimmers of Jamaica
Swimmers at the 2016 Summer Olympics
Swimmers at the 2014 Summer Youth Olympics
Pan American Games competitors for Jamaica
Swimmers at the 2015 Pan American Games
Sportspeople from Kingston, Jamaica
Male backstroke swimmers
20th-century Jamaican people
21st-century Jamaican people